Viva la revolución (Spanish), or Vive la révolution (French), translated as "long live the revolution", refers primarily to:

 The French Revolution (1789–1799)
 The Cuban Revolution (1953–1959)

It may also refer to:

Arts and media

Music
Viva la Revolution (album), by Dragon Ash, or the title song, 1999
Viva la Revolution, an album by Ruben Ramos & the Mexican Revolution, 2008
Viva la Revolucion, an EP by Revolution Void, 1999
"Viva la Revolution" (song), by the Adicts, 1982
"Viva la Revolución", a song by Sunny Lax, 2011

Other media
Tepepa, a 1968 film also released as Tepepa... Viva la Revolución
Viva La Revolución!, an episode of Kid Nation
Vive la Revolution a book by Mark Steel

Other
Vive la Révolution, a French political group co-founded by Roland Castro

See also
Revolución (disambiguation)
Revolution
Guerrillero Heroico
Russian Revolution
Spanish Revolution (disambiguation)